The Pink Line is an  rapid transit line in Chicago, run by the Chicago Transit Authority (CTA) as part of the Chicago "L" system. It is the CTA's newest rail line and began operation for a 180-day trial period on June 25, 2006, running between 54th/Cermak station in Cicero, Illinois and the Loop in downtown Chicago. The route, as the line is about to enter downtown Chicago, shares tracks with Green Line trains on Lake Street. This connection is handled by the previously non-revenue Paulina Connector set of tracks. In 2021, an average of 7,779 passengers boarded Pink Line trains on weekdays.

Operation 
On the Pink Line, what was once the Blue Line's Cermak branch, begins at 54th Avenue and Cermak Road in Cicero (5400 W. - 2200 S.). The line runs on at-grade tracks parallel to Cermak Road from the terminal to about a quarter-mile (400 m) east of Cicero Avenue, then diagonals northeast until it reaches a corridor parallel and adjacent to 21st Street at Kostner Avenue. It then continues east between 21st Street and Cullerton Street, climbing up from at-grade tracks to elevated tracks, through the North Lawndale, Little Village and Pilsen neighborhoods of Chicago, with stops at Kostner, Pulaski, Central Park, Kedzie, California, Western and Damen. 

The line turns north near Paulina Street stopping at 18th and Polk stations, then crosses over the Eisenhower Expressway (Interstate 290). Here, a two track non-revenue branch diverges that descends to the expressway to provide a non-revenue track connection to the Blue Line. It continues on the Paulina Connector to share tracks with the Green Line on Lake Street with stops at Ashland, Morgan and Clinton, before operating around the Loop clockwise.

History

As the Blue Line Douglas/Cermak branch 
Originally, Douglas trains were operated by the Metropolitan West Side Elevated directly into the Loop by means of the Metropolitan's main line. Construction of the Congress Street Superhighway (known now as the Eisenhower Expressway, I-290) in the 1950s required the removal of the Metropolitan's main line, resulting in Douglas trains being routed to the Loop via the Paulina Connector and the Lake Street 'L' similar to the current service. 

The Douglas branch was re-named the Cermak branch in the mid-1990s. The entire Cermak branch is ADA accessible.

Converting to the Pink Line 
In January 2006, the CTA held hearings on its proposal to reroute trains from 54th/Cermak via the recently rebuilt Paulina Connector to the Lake Street Green Line tracks, then operating around the Loop clockwise for the first time since Douglas trains began using the Milwaukee-Dearborn Subway in downtown Chicago on June 22, 1958. This would allow a doubling of Blue Line trains to Forest Park on the Congress Branch, since service would no longer be divided between the Forest Park and 54th/Cermak terminals. The CTA has also promised that service to/from 54th/Cermak would be increased 100% during weekday rush hours.

At the initial time of proposal, this plan was often referred to as the "Silver Line," as the original idea was to use gray as the line color on printed materials and give it the route name of "Silver."

In February 2006, the CTA approved the separate plan. Non-rush hour trains would be routed via the Loop, Green Line tracks and Paulina Connector. During weekday rush hours, service would be available on this routing as well as the original route via the Dearborn Street subway every half hour. These changes went into effect beginning June 25, 2006, with the trial period scheduled to end 180 days later on December 22, 2006.

In March 2006, the Chicago Transit Authority announced that of the top three colors, Pink, Gold and Silver, Pink had received the most votes in a write-in essay contest for Chicago-area schoolchildren in kindergarten through 8th grade—a $1,000 savings bond was awarded to a selected essay writer who advocated for the color pink.

The Pink Line began operation in June 2006, using the rebuilt Paulina Connector, which had not been used in regular revenue service for 48 years.

The service, which was originally set up as a temporary service to be run for a trial period of 180 days (6 months), doubles service on both the Douglas branch and the Forest Park branch of the Blue Line. Pink Line trains operate clockwise on the Inner Loop track via Lake-Wabash-Van Buren-Wells before returning to 54th/Cermak.

On December 12, 2006, the CTA board approved a six-month extension to the trial period before making a decision on whether or not to make the changes permanent, and another 180-day extension was added to the trial in June 2007. On December 4, 2008, CTA announced its decision to make the Pink Line permanent.

Operating hours and headways
The Pink Line operates between 54th/Cermak and the Loop weekdays from 4 a.m. to 2 a.m., and weekends from 5 a.m. to 2 a.m. Trains run on a minimum headway of 20 minutes after midnight, decreasing to 8-9 minutes during weekday rush hours.

Rolling stock 
The Pink Line is operated with the Bombardier-built 5000-series railcars. Trains operate using four cars on weekdays and weekends. Frequently, the Pink and Green Lines borrow each other's cars when either line is short on cars. Since September 2018, two cars sets assigned to the Pink Line make weekday rush hour trips on the Blue Line. At the time of their reintroduction, all Pink Line consists using 5000-series cars were six cars long. As of mid-August 2012, the Pink Line was using the 5000-series cars in four and six car consists. 

With the successful testing of the Pink Line 5000-series cars in four car consists during August, the Pink Line reverted to running four cars during most times of the day. Some of the 5000-series cars that had been assigned to the line, were reassigned to the Green Line. The last 2600-series cars were removed from service from the Pink Line in June 2012, making the Pink Line the first line to be fully equipped with the 5000-series cars. Most of the Pink Line's 2600-series cars were reassigned to the Blue Line to replace its 2200-series cars.

Possible route to Ravenswood

These considerations have been undergoing study and analysis.

Station listing

After stopping at Washington/Wells, Pink Line trains return to Clinton, then make all stops back to 54th/Cermak.

Rail yard
The 54th Yard is a CTA rail yard for the Pink Line in Cicero, Illinois. Currently, 5000-series railcars are stored here.

See also
Douglas Branch

References

External links

 Pink Line at CTA official site
 CTA Selects Winning Essay of Name the Line Contest - CTA Press Release on the Pink line

 
Railway lines opened in 2006
Railway lines in Chicago
2006 establishments in Illinois